Languages of Truth is a collection of essays by Salman Rushdie. It was published in May 2021 by Random House.

Overview
The book includes pieces written between 2003 and 2020, many of them never previously in print and engaging with a variety of subjects such as storytelling, literature, culture, myths, language, migration and censorship.

Rushdie begins the book with a sentence, "Before there were books, there were stories", and reflects on the art of storytelling and on his individual search for a narrative. A journey that took him beyond the realm of realism in order to create magical universes of alternative realities. In the book, Rushdie celebrates the potential of stories as catalysts for nourishing the imagination. He suggests that adults lose some of the awe children have for repeated stories with which they fall in love.

Languages of truth reflects on novels and novelists ranging from Leo Tolstoy, Philip Roth, Cervantes and Samuel Beckett to Kurt Vonnegut. There are also some pieces on painters like Amrita Sher-Gil and Bhupen Khakhar, as well as some mentions of directors like Federico Fellini and Danny Boyle.

In an interview about his book with Amanpour & Company, Rushdie says:I grow up in India the immediate aftermath of British Empire, and what the British told people was the truth about that event was very rapidly proved to be something very unlike the truth. I mean I remember in India as a child the history books changing from the ones that the British had left behind, to the ones that had been written after independence; and people who had been characterized as villains, were now characterized as heroes, because of their part in the independence struggle. So truth is a battle, and maybe never more so than now.

Reception
Languages of Truth was longlisted for PEN/Diamonstein-Spielvogel Award.

In a lukewarm review for The New York Times, Dwight Garner described the book as "a defensive castling move", referring to the author's suggestion that the turn in literary culture from brio-filled imaginative writing toward the humbler delights of "autofiction" is the reason for misunderstanding and mistreatment of his works. Garner compares the book with one of Rushdie's previous ones, Imaginary Homelands, saying: "Back then Rushdie wrote nonfiction for editors, not for foundations and colleges", and although then "he was not a major critic" he was "a strong one". Garner goes on to conclude: "If his arguments about the state of fiction in Languages of Truth don't convince, at least they're genuine signs of life."

Paul Perry, in The Independent, described the book as interesting, engaging and entertaining, mentioning that many of the essays were delivered as lectures and "[E]ven though they have been revised for print they maintain a kind of erudite breeziness in their tone".

References 

2021 non-fiction books
British books
Essay collections
Works by Salman Rushdie
Random House books